Danielle Marcotte (born April 1950) is a Canadian writer living in Quebec.

She was born in Montreal and received a bachelor's degree in literature and a master's degree in adult education. Marcotte has worked in media relations, journalism, teaching, editing and communications. From 2004 to 2009, she was responsible for promoting reading for the Department of Education in the Swiss Canton of Jura.

Marcotte married the Swiss politician , who died in 2008. She returned to Quebec in autumn 2009.

Selected works 
 Poil de serpent, dent d'araignée (1996), received a Mr. Christie's Book Award
 La légende de Jos Montferrand (2001)
 Les Sabots rouges (2004), nominated for a Governor General's Literary Award
 Au lit, Moka! (2010), awarded second place in the category children's book at the Alcuin Society Awards

References 

1950 births
Living people
Canadian children's writers in French
Writers from Montreal
Canadian women children's writers